Alfred Dickinson Barksdale (July 17, 1892 – August 16, 1972), frequently known as A. D. Barksdale, was an American soldier, Virginia lawyer, state senator, state court judge, and a United States district judge of the United States District Court for the Western District of Virginia.

Early family life and education

Born at "Giant Poplars" in Houston, Virginia (now Halifax) to the former Hallie Bailey Craddock, and her husband, William R. Barksdale Sr. His paternal grandfather, Elisha Barksdale (1812–1887), had represented Halifax County in the Virginia House of Delegates during the final years of the Civil War (1863-5), after purchasing the Union Iron Works with partners Jonathan B. Stovall and John P Barksdale in 1862. Though too young to enlist in the Confederate Army, as a militia cadet William Barksdale had fought at the Battle of Staunton River Bridge in 1864 before receiving his degrees and becoming a Virginia lawyer, circuit judge (initially perhaps the youngest at age 24, but elected to successive terms until his death in 1925), South Boston bank president and state senator (1897–1905) Albert Barksdale 's mother died in 1900 but he had four elder brothers, one younger brother and four older sisters, and his father remarried. One brother become a surgeon in Lynchburg, another a Richmond Bank president and one of his sisters was supervisor of elementary education and Sunday school superintendent in Halifax County. Educated at the local public schools and the Cluster Springs Academy, Barksdale received his college education in Lexington, Virginia, graduating with a Bachelor of Science degree from Virginia Military Institute in 1911 at the age of 18. He then earned a Bachelor of Laws from the University of Virginia School of Law, where he was president of his class, in 1915. Barksdale practiced law in Lynchburg, Virginia, from 1915 to 1916 before leaving to enter military service.

Military service

Barksdale served in the United States Army from 1916 to 1922, with the Virginia-based 116th Infantry Regiment of the 29th Infantry Division in Europe during World War I. Rising to the rank of captain, Barksdale received the Distinguished Service Cross, the Croix de Guerre, and the Chevalier Legion of Honor.

Distinguished Service Cross citation

"Alfred D. Barksdale, captain, 116th Infantry. For repeated acts of extraordinary heroism in action near Samogneux, France, October 8, 1918; near Molleville, France, October 12; and in the Bois de la Grand Montagne, France, October 15, 1918. Commanding a support company during the attack of October 8, Capt. Barksdale discovered that his battalion had advanced ahead of the unit on the right flank, and was suffering heavy losses from machine gun fire. Without orders he attacked and captured the guns, taking many prisoners. On October 12 he worked for over an hour, exposed to a terrific bombardment, binding the wounds of his men. On October 15 he advanced alone in a thick wood and, with the aid of his pistol, put out of action a destructive machine gun which was pouring such a deadly fire his men could not raise their heads."

University of Virginia presentation

At the centennial ceremonies for the University of Virginia, Captain Barksdale on behalf of the alumni presented the University with a plaque listing the names of 80 graduates killed in World War I.

Virginia lawyer, state senator and judge

Barksdale returned to private practice in Lynchburg from 1922 to 1938. He aligned with the Byrd Organization, and won election to the Senate of Virginia, representing the 12th Virginia senatorial district (then Lynchburg and Campbell County and still a part-time position) from 1924 to 1928. Following the Great Depression, the Virginia General Assembly elected Barksdale as Judge of the Virginia Circuit Court for the Sixth Judicial Circuit, where his father had served for so many years, and he served from 1938 to 1940.

Federal judicial service

Barksdale received a recess appointment from President Franklin D. Roosevelt on December 19, 1939, to a seat on the United States District Court for the Western District of Virginia vacated by Judge Armistead Mason Dobie. He was nominated to the same position by President Roosevelt on January 11, 1940. He was confirmed by the United States Senate on February 1, 1940, and received his commission on February 5, 1940. He assumed senior status on August 1, 1957. His service terminated on August 16, 1972, due to his death.

Assigned a school desegregation case involving Pulaski County, which had no high school for black students, but three secondary schools for white students, as well as manifestly unequal elementary schools, Barksdale insisted that no two schools are ever precisely equal, and that the arguments of Spottswood Robinson and Oliver Hill concerning desegregation would be the death knell for consolidated high schools (black students were bused up to sixty miles per day to attend a training academy in Christiansburg). The Fourth Circuit Court of Appeals soon reversed him in 1949, which stunned the Richmond News Leader, which printed an editorial by Douglas Southall Freeman acknowledging that 44 Virginia counties and cities had no accredited black high school.

Personal life

Barksdale married Louisa Estill Winfree on December 15, 1934, and they had two daughters.

Death and legacy 

Barksdale died on August 16, 1972 in Lynchburg, and is buried at its historic Spring Hill cemetery. His wartime papers from his World War I service are held by the VMI library, and those from his federal judicial service are held by the University of Virginia library. VMI established a scholarship in his name in 1974-1975.

References

Sources

External links
 A Guide to the Alfred Dickinson Barksdale Papers

1892 births
1972 deaths
Virginia Military Institute alumni
University of Virginia School of Law alumni
Virginia lawyers
Judges of the United States District Court for the Western District of Virginia
United States district court judges appointed by Franklin D. Roosevelt
20th-century American judges
People from Halifax, Virginia
Recipients of the Distinguished Service Cross (United States)
Democratic Party Virginia state senators
Virginia circuit court judges